Stephen Keech is an American producer, songwriter, and composer living in Nashville, Tennessee. He spent his early years as the vocalist and songwriter for Solid State Records band Haste the Day.  He was also the vocalist for New Day Awakening and is the current bassist for As Cities Burn.

History

In 2002, Keech started his musical career with the band New Day Awakening, for whom he provided vocals. The band recorded an EP, titled: Plague: Hysteria in 2005, but disbanded in 2006.

In 2007, Keech was asked to join Haste the Day after original vocalist Jimmy Ryan left the band. Keech's previous band had toured with Haste the Day before. The band recorded a Split EP with From Autumn to Ashes, titled Stitches/Deth Kult Social Club in 2007, before recording Keech's HTD debut, Pressure the Hinges.

In 2008, the band parted ways with lead guitarist Jason Barnes for no longer being a Christian. They asked Dave Krysl (former New Day Awakening member) to join as touring lead guitarist. The band recorded Dreamer in 2008, before Brennan Chaulk and Devin Chaulk left the band. They then made Dave Krysl an official member, hired guitarist Scotty Whelan (ex-Phinehas), and drummer Giuseppe Capolupo (ex-Demise of Eros, Once Nothing). This new lineup recorded Attack of the Wolf King and eventually disbanded in 2011.

In 2012, former label mates, As Cities Burn, hired Keech to be their touring bassist.

In 2014, Haste the Day reunited to record Coward, which was produced by Keech and released in 2015. The band also played a series of album release shows in support of Coward. The future of the band is still unknown.

On August 3, 2016, As Cities Burn added Keech to the official lineup. On August 17, 2016, two weeks later, the band announced they would be disbanding.

Personal life
Keech was raised by a pastor. Keech currently resides in East Nashville with his wife.  Since Haste the Day disbanded, Keech spent time interning under producer Paul Moak. He has since opened his own studio, and has worked with artists such as Brandon Heath, The Ember Days, Haste The Day, Tenth Avenue North, Bandit, Veridia, Cardboard Kids, Wall of Ears, Bones Owens, and Copper Fox.

Bands
Current
 Haste the Day – Vocals (2007–2011, 2014–present)
 Keech (Solo) – Vocals (2012–present)
 As Cities Burn – Bass (2012–2013, 2015–2016, 2017-present)
Former
 New Day Awakening – Vocals (2002–2006)

Discography
Haste the Day
 Stitches/Deth Kult Social Club (2007; Split EP with From Autumn To Ashes)
 Pressure the Hinges (2007)
 Dreamer (2008)
 Attack of the Wolf King (2010)
 Coward (2015)

Keech
 ! (2012)

New Day Awakening
 Plague: Hysteria (2005)

As Cities Burn
 Scream Through the Walls (2019)

External links
 Stephen Keech on Facebook
 Stephen Keech Producer
  Retrieved on August 28, 2016.

References

Solid State Records artists
Christian metal musicians
Living people
American performers of Christian music
1986 births
21st-century American singers
21st-century American male singers